Frisland, also called Frischlant, Friesland, Frislanda, Frislandia, or Fixland, is a phantom island that appeared on virtually all of the maps of the North Atlantic from the 1560s through the 1660s.

History 

Frisland originally may also have been a cartographic approximation of Iceland, but in 1558 the influential Zeno map charted the landmass as an entirely separate island south (or occasionally south-west) of Iceland. 

After this incorrect charting, the phantom island appeared that way on maps for the next 100 years. Its existence was given currency in manuscript maps of the 1560s by the Maggiolo family of Genoa, and the island was accepted and reproduced by cartographers Gerardus Mercator and Jodocus Hondius. Some early maps by Willem Blaeu, such as his 1617 map of Europe, omit it, but it reappeared on his 1630 world map as one of many islands shown off the eastern coast of Labrador, which was then believed to extend to within a few hundred miles of Scotland. It also appeared on a 1652 world map by Visscher, largely copied from that of Blaeu. The 1693 Vincenzo Coronelli map places it close to Greenland. Frederick J. Pohl identified Frisland with an island he referred to as "Fer Island", modern English Fair Isle, an island lying between mainland Shetland and the Orkney islands in his book arguing the case that Henry I Sinclair, Earl of Orkney visited North America. Even in the mid-18th century, explorers' maps clearly depicted Frisland as separated from Greenland by a wide strait. 

The myth of Frisland was gradually dispensed with as explorers, chiefly from England and France, charted and mapped the waters of the North Atlantic.

Depiction 
Frisland was shown as a roughly rectangular island, with three triangular promontories on its western coast. 

In some mappings, it is identified as "Fixland". ( map of 1553, from Library of Congress, see upper right of map; see also, page 88 for other clearer source; See also Catalan map of 1480 showing "Fixland"; original source map copied in this article, page 64)

See also 
 Buss Island
 Estotiland
 Martin Frobisher

References

Further reading 

 

Phantom islands of the Atlantic
History of Greenland